Program Manager is the shell of Windows 3.x and Windows NT 3.x operating systems. This shell exposed a task-oriented graphical user interface (GUI), consisting of icons (shortcuts for programs) arranged into program groups. It replaced MS-DOS Executive, a file manager, as the default Windows shell.

OS/2 2.0 and later included the Program Manager as part of its Win-OS/2 compatibility layer. Win-OS/2, including the Program Manager, are still included in later derivatives of OS/2 such as ArcaOS.

Overview
Program Manager descends from Desktop Manager (also known as Presentation Manager), the shell for OS/2 1.2. Unlike Desktop Manager, which presents its program groups in a simple list, and opens each group in a separate window, Program Manager opens program groups in child windows using the new multiple document interface in Windows 3.x. The icons used to represent Program Manager itself, program groups, and DOS applications in Windows 3.0 are carried over from OS/2 1.2. Windows 3.1 uses updated versions of these icons.

When executables were dropped into Program Manager from File Manager, Program Manager automatically used the executable's default icon embedded as data inside the .EXE file.  Additionally, the Windows Setup program, which populated Program Manager with the standard icons of a fresh install, could also be used to add new icons in bulk after installation. Using SETUP /P from the command line, a standard layout could be installed on many machines in an enterprise using a single SETUP.INF configuration file.

Beginning with Windows 3.1, Program Manager contained a StartUp group. Programs and files placed into that group would be loaded when Windows starts.

Holding down the shift key while selecting File then Exit Windows will save the current configuration of Program Manager to PROGMAN.INI, including the position of all program group icons, assuming that auto-arrange has been disabled.  This allowed Microsoft testers to try many different configurations, but the feature remained in the shipped version.

In later versions of Microsoft Windows, starting with Windows 95 and Windows NT 4.0, Program Manager was replaced by Windows Explorer as the default shell. Specifically, the Start Menu took over program organization and launching duties. However, Windows 95 still gave the user the option to start Program Manager at boot.

Program Manager was still included in later versions of Windows, and could be accessed by executing PROGMAN.EXE from the command line or Run dialog. It could be used as the default shell by specifying the Shell value in the registry at either HKLM\SOFTWARE\Microsoft\Windows NT\CurrentVersion\Winlogon (per machine) or HKCU\SOFTWARE\Microsoft\Windows NT\CurrentVersion\Winlogon (per user).

Microsoft replaced Program Manager in Windows XP Service Pack 2 with a compatibility stub that simply redirects to Windows Explorer. In Windows Vista and later, PROGMAN.EXE was permanently removed from the operating system.

See also
Presentation Manager
Windows shell replacement

References

Cited works

Windows components
Graphical user interfaces
Discontinued Windows components